is a Japanese footballer who plays as a left winger or a left back for Fagiano Okayama in the J2 League.

Career statistics

Club

References

External links 
 Profile at Shonan Bellmare 
 
 Profile at Nagoya Grampus
 

1993 births
Living people
Meiji University alumni
Association football people from Gunma Prefecture
Japanese footballers
J1 League players
J2 League players
Nagoya Grampus players
Shonan Bellmare players
Matsumoto Yamaga FC players
Fagiano Okayama players
Association football midfielders